Razorback Killers is the tenth album by heavy metal band Vicious Rumors, released in 2011.

Track listing
"Murderball" - 4:09
"Razorback Blade" - 4:15
"Black" - 6:01
"Bloodstained Sunday" - 5:52
"Pearl of Wisdom" - 6:34
"All I Want is You" - 4:28
"Axe to Grind" - 3:37
"Let the Garden Burn" - 5:08
"Right of Devastation" - 4:23
"Deal with the Devil" - 7:08

Personnel
 Geoff Thorpe: Guitars, Vocals
 Kiyoshi Morgan: Guitars
 Stephen Goodwin: Bass
 Larry Howe: Drums
 Brian Allen: Vocals

References

2011 albums
Vicious Rumors albums